is a village located in Ōshima Subprefecture, Tokyo Metropolis, Japan. The village comprises the whole of To-shima Island.

Approximately 330 people live on the island. Eighty per cent of the island is covered by camellia forests. From November to March, much of the island is red from the camellia flowers. The island is also home to the Saku lily (Lilium auratum var. platyphyllum), the largest lily in the world.

The island is between Izu Ōshima, the largest of the Izu Islands, and Nii-jima. Ferries that sail to Nii-jima make a brief stop in To-shima. Toshima is also accessible (weather permitting) by helicopter departing from Ōshima island, from Ōshima airport it is a 10-minute flight to To-shima.

The main industry on To-shima is fishing. There is some small-scale farming and tourism.

Geography
, a volcanic island in the Izu Islands, is administered by the Tōkyō Metropolitan government. It lies south of Tōkyō and east of the Izu Peninsula, Shizuoka Prefecture. To-shima forms part of the Fuji-Hakone-Izu National Park. The island has been recognised as an Important Bird Area (IBA) by BirdLife International because it supports populations of Japanese wood pigeons, Pleske's grasshopper warblers, Ijima's leaf-warblers and Izu thrushes.

Education
There is a single combined elementary and junior high school, Toshima Elementary and Junior High School (利島村立利島小中学校).

For high school students may attend schools on other islands operated by the Tokyo Metropolitan Board of Education.

Gallery

See also

 List of islands of Japan

Notes

References
 Teikoku's Complete Atlas of Japan, Teikoku-Shoin Co., Ltd. Tokyo 1990, 
 Saishin-Nihon-chizu 1990 - Atlas of Japan, Imidas Shueisha, Tokyo

External links

To-shima Village Official Website 

Izu Islands
Islands of Tokyo
Important Bird Areas of the Nanpo Islands